The Generales de Durango (English: Durango Generals)  are a professional baseball team in the Mexican League (LMB) that was established in November 2016. The team is based in Durango, the capital and largest city of the Mexican state of Durango. They entered the league in 2017 as a replacement for the departed Delfines del Carmen.

History

Creation
In November 2016, LMB owners approved the move of the Delfines from Ciudad del Carmen, Campeche, to Durango, restoring professional baseball to the state for the first time since the Alacranes de Durango moved to Campeche to become the Piratas de Campeche in 1980. A remodeled Estadio de Béisbol Francisco Villa in Durango was announced as the home venue. The move was nearly put in danger by economic risk, as reports circulated that the Generales would not play in 2017 due to the owner's lack of financial resources and delays in the remodeling of the stadium. The franchise managed to begin play, though a delay of the planned opening game in the stadium was necessary.

Initial season
The Generales finished the 2017 season with a 43–66 record, last in the North Division. Yadir Drake led the team in hitting with a .385 average; he and Jairo Perez had 14 home runs. Perez led the team in RBI with 65. Fernando Nieve had the lowest ERA, 2.25. Mario Gonzalez led the team in strikeouts with 77. Amilcar Gaxiola had the most wins, seven.

Suspension and reinstatement
In September 2017, the league announced that the Generales would take the 2018 season off, to reorganize their finances, and return in 2019. However, this decision was appealed by the Generales. At a subsequent league meeting in November 2017, the decision was made that the Generales would compete in 2018, subject to a two-year guarantee of financial solvency.

Roster

References

External links
  

Baseball teams in Mexico
Baseball teams established in 2016
Mexican League teams
2016 establishments in Mexico
Sports teams in Durango
Durango City